Fabio Bartolo Rizzo, better known by his stage name Marracash, is an Italian rapper. Starting his career in the rap group Dogo Gang, he debuted as a solo artist rising in fame in the 2010s releasing six studio albums that reached the top ten of the Italian Albums Chart, including two top positions with Santeria (2016) and Persona (2019). The rapper has also released numerous successful singles and collaborations scoring seventeen times the top ten of the Italian Singles Chart. Thanks to his work he has sold over 5 million copies in Italy, becoming one of the top selling Italian rappers in the 2010s.

In the course of his musical projects he has sung and written songs with numerous artists including rap artists like Gué Pequeno, J-Ax, Fabri Fibra, Emis Killa, Club Dogo, Baby K, and pop influences artist as Tiziano Ferro, Giusy Ferreri, Elisa, Federica Abbate and Elodie.

In 2013, together with producer Shablo, he founded the independent record label Roccia Music, which involves established figures and newcomers to rap, producers and DJs. From 2012 to 2014 he host MTV Italy's freestyle music TV program MTV Spit.

Biography 
Fabio Rizzo Bartolo was born in Nicosia, Sicily from a mother who worked as a custodian and a father who worked as a truck driver. He has a younger brother. His family then moved to Milan in a house in Bramante; when he was ten, he was expelled from his home with his family, who moved to the suburbs of Barona, where he grew up and still lives.

After graduating as an electronical technician, Rizzo recorded his first verses under the pseudonym Yuza delle Nuvole, appearing in Prodigio's 1999 demo "The Royal Rumble", alongside Il Guercio, Fame, Aken and Corvo D'Argento. He adopted the stage name Marracash after his childhood nickname,  (jokingly because of his Sicilian origins), as a pun on the name of Marrakesh.

Career
Its debut dates back to 2004 in the PMC VS Club Dogo mixtape - the official Mixtape, product born from the collaboration between the Club Dogo and the Massive Crew Portion, contacts in Milan and Bologna. In the same year the collective Dogo Gang came to life, within which Marracash's militancy is gradually consolidating, marking a new stage with the participation within Regular, album of Club Dogo, and of Hashishinz Sound Vol. 1, by Gué Pequeno and Deleterio.

In 2005, under the Contagion Area label, Marracash published "Popolare", a single product by Don Joe made available for free download for network users. The song anticipated the release of the mixtape Roccia Music I,  mixtape in which the Dogo Gang (Club Dogo, Vincenzo da Via Anfossi, Deleterio and Ted Bundy) collaborated and guests such as Inoki, Co'Sang, Rischio, Shablo, Misa and Royal Mehdi.

In June 2008, his first solo album Marracash was released by Universal Music, which reached the ninth position of the Italian Albums Chart, receiving a gold certification. Guests of the album are Gué Pequeno and J-Ax, Vincenzo da Via Anfossi and Jake La Furia. Two singles were extracted from the album: "Badabum Cha Cha", which becomes the singer's first top ten, and "Estate in città".

In 2009, he participated together with 55 other Italian singers in the realization of "Domani 21/04.2009", a musical track published in a charitable way to remember the victims affected by the 2009 L'Aquila earthquake. Towards the end of the year the song Cani pazzi, which anticipated Marracash's second album Fino a qui tutto bene, out on 13 July 2010. The collaborations present are with Giusy Ferreri in "Rivincita" and Fabri Fibra in "Stupidi",  with less success than the previous project.

In September 2011, he released the song "King of rap", which anticipated the eponymous album released in October. The album debuts at the third position of the FIMI chart receiving the platinum certification. Later in 2012 he released the collaboration "Giusto un giro" with Emis Killa and announced the inauguration of his own record label, La Roccia Music. On 22 December, Marracash conducts the first episode of MTV Spit, a television program focused on the rap battle between artists of the underground scene.

After the release of the collective album Genesis with the artists of the Rock Music of 2013, on 20 January 2015, he published his fourth studio album Status which reached the number 2 position of the Italian Albums Chart and 32 of the Swiss Charts. From the album he releases the homonymous single "Status", which peaked at number 2 of Italian Singles Chart,  "Senza un posto nel mondo" with Tiziano Ferro, "In radio" and "Niente canzoni d'amore" with Federica Abbate.

In 2016 the rapper announced the release of a studio album with Gué Pequeno. Published on 24 June of the same year, the album is entitled Santeria and is composed of fifteen tracks, which became his first number one album. The forerunner single "Nulla accade", released on 7 June, is certified double platinum and reaches position number 16 of the Italian Singles Chart.

After the release of the album collecting hits for the 10th anniversary of Marracashs release, on 12 June 2019, he published the collaboration with singer Elodie, "Margarita", which peaked at number nine of Singles Chart and selling over 100,000 copies in Italy. On 31 October 2019, the sixth album of the rapper Persona is released. The album peaked at number one of FIMI Chart and receiving the double platinum certification. It was supported by several hit singles, including "Marylean", with Salmo and Nitro, "Crudelia - I nervi" and his number one song" Supreme - L'ego". On 6 March 2020 he released a new track "Neon - Le Ali" featuring Italian songwriter Elisa, peaking at number five of Italian Singles Chart. In 2020 the rapper collaborated with Dardust in "Defuera" and the third lead single from Persona "Sport - I muscoli", which peaked at number three of Italian Chart.

On 17 November 2021, Marracash surprisingly announced on Instagram his seventh studio album Noi, loro, gli altri (Us, Them, The Others), which was released two days later. The album, consisting of fourteen tracks, was entirely produced by Zef and Marz and features three guests: Gué Pequeno, Calcutta and Blanco. The first extract from the album was "Crazy Love", promoted by the related music video, starring his ex-girlfriend Elodie.

Music influences and style 

In a TV interview with AllMusic in July 2008, Marracash said he regularly listened to Metallica and 883 as a child. He takes inspiration from American artists such as Jay-Z, Drake, Kanye West, DJ Khaled, Nas, Kendrick Lamar, Wu-Tang Clan. From Italy, he cites Frankie Hi-NRG MC.

Marracash described his writing and writing process for the 2019 album Persona in an interview on Rolling Stone Italy: "It develops over time, in the sense that I mature stuff, it's something I do on an introspective level, I do it without writing. I just take notes and then at a certain point I throw them out, and when I started writing the pieces flowed out like blood from a wound." He then describes his feelings and the way he analyzes the situations he reports in the texts: "I exercise a constant self-consciousness that leads me to experience emotions very intensely. [...] But each time I tend to pull the rope a bit to its extreme and it is perhaps also a way to feel alive, a search for adrenaline, because in the end I detach myself enough to find them stronger than before."

Criticism and controversy 
In 2006, when Marracash criticized Nesli's way of rapping through the song "Popular", a kind of rivalry between the two began. The following year, in fact, Nesli responded to Marracash with the song "Life is just one", accusing him of making neighborhood rhymes and being a chatterbox. Marracash's response came in 2008 with the song "Dritto al punto", in which he reversed the quotations made by the opposing rapper, who replied with "Riot", closing the debate.

On 14 January 2017, six months after the publication of Santeria, Marracash and Gué Pequeno gave an interview to Corriere della Sera, in which they commented on the musical style adopted by their colleagues Fedez and J-Ax, at the time close to the publication of Comunisti col Rolex, criticizing the artists and accusing them of masking their intent to make numbers and money with false intentions. Fedez responded to the accusations by explaining that the two rappers criticized the duo on purpose to have visibility, as well as calling Marracash a coward to not meet him during Moschino's fashion show; Marracash, referring to Fedez as "dwarf with Napoleon complex", denied what Fedez said about the fashion show, claiming that the colleague had not even sought eye contact with him on that occasion, and ironic about the choice to attend the parades with bodyguards.

Personal life 
Between 2019 and 2021, the rapper was in a relationship with singer Elodie.

Discography

Studio albums

Live albums

Mixtapes

Singles

As lead artist

As featured artist

Other selected charted songs

Guest appearances

References

External links

 Official website

Italian male singers
Italian rappers
People from Nicosia, Sicily
Living people
Year of birth missing (living people)
Musicians from the Province of Enna